The American Basketball League (ABL) was a semi-professional men's basketball league that began play in January 2013. It is the fourth league to use the ABL name.

Steven A. Hanley, former agent of Magic Johnson, was ABL President and CEO. Former assistant athletic director at Florida Atlantic University Eric Newsome held the position of league commissioner. He played college basketball at Miami University (1983–88), including three seasons with five-time NBA champion Ron Harper. Newsome is fourth leading all-time scorers for the RedHawks.

History

2013
Twelve teams (based in Florida and Texas) in two divisions (Lone Star and Tropics) competed in the inaugural season of 2013. The first season of the ABL began in January with a planned 24-game schedule. The season was never completed due to a number of factors, including allegations of unpaid players and coaches and game day incidents.

2014
The second season featured a slimmed-down league with four south Florida-based teams competing. Two original teams, Fort Lauderdale Sharks and Palm Beach Hurricane, were joined by newcomers Orlando Lightning and Pompano Beach Cobras. After a 14-game regular season, Fort Lauderdale defeated Orlando 90-84 to win the first-ever ABL championship. Both teams finished 8-6 in the regular season, with the Sharks winning four-of-five matchups.

2015
Season 3 again had four teams competing with the expansion Orlando Whalers replacing the Palm Beach Hurricane. Orlando Lightning went 4-0 before defeating the Whalers in the championship game to capture the summer league title.

The league is reportedly in negotiations with The Bahamas Basketball Federation to form a division on the island.

No 2016 season was played.

Teams

Former teams
 Corpus Christi Clutch
 Davie Stars
 Emerald Coast Knights
 Heartland Eagles
 Lone Star Law
 Palm Beach Hurricane
 Panama City Breeze
 Pompano Beach Cobras
 South Texas Revolution
 Sugar Land Legends (joined ABA in Fall of 2014)
 Texas Surge
 Twin City United

Champions

References

External links
 Official ABL website
 @hoopsABL

Basketball leagues in the United States
Professional sports leagues in the United States
2012 establishments in the United States
Sports leagues established in 2012
Sports leagues disestablished in 2015
2015 disestablishments in the United States